Astrodomi observatory is an astronomical observatory located in Tigre, Buenos Aires Province, Argentina. It has observatory code I37.

See also
 List of astronomical observatories
 Lists of telescopes

References

External links 
 Observatory website

Astronomical observatories in Argentina
Buildings and structures in Buenos Aires Province